"Morningtown Ride" is a lullaby, written and performed by Malvina Reynolds. It was covered by The Seekers and their recording reached No. 2 on the UK Singles Chart.  The song tells the comforting story of the journey through nighttime made by all the "little travellers" (children), on board a train, with the Sandman as guard.

The Seekers version
The song was performed by The Seekers with Bobby Richards and his Orchestra on the 1964 album Hide & Seekers (W&G Records WG-B-2362). It was subsequently re-recorded and released as a single in 1966 (Columbia DB 8060), produced by Tom Springfield.

The song spent 15 weeks on the UK Singles Chart, reaching No. 2 on 28 December 1966. In the United States, the song spent seven weeks on the Billboard Hot 100, reaching No. 44, while reaching No. 13 on Billboards Easy Listening chart.

Charts

Other versions
It was sung by The Limeliters, an American singing group led by Glenn Yarbrough, and appears on their 1962 album Through Children's Eyes. RCA Victor LSP 2512 (stereo), RCA Victor LPM 2512 (mono).
Malvina Reynolds herself recorded it on her 1970 album Artichokes, Griddle Cakes, and Other Good Things (Pacific Cascade Records LP-7018).
It was also recorded by The Flanagans in 1964.
Loretta Lynn and The Statler Brothers performed this song in 1989.
Country Four, a Swedish group, made a Swedish version, Vägen till morgonstad (1967).
The Irish Rovers recorded versions of the song, which were released on the 1972 album The Irish Rovers Live and the 1976 album Children of the Unicorn. In 1973, The Irish Rovers' version reached No. 83 on Canada's RPM 100 and No. 39 on RPMs Adult Contemporary Playlist.
Bob McGrath sang this song on the Sesame Street album, Bert & Ernie Sing-Along in 1975.
Raffi sang this song on his 1980 album Baby Beluga (Rounder).
Brendan Grace recorded a version of the song, which reached No. 25 on the Irish Singles Chart on 6 January 1985.
The Wiggles and Jimmy Little sang this song on their 2000 album It's a Wiggly Wiggly World (Lyons Group).
Genevieve Jereb sang this song on her 2004 album, Cool Bananas (Gellybean Records).
Erkki Liikanen recorded a Finnish language version, "Matka Aamun Kaupunkiin", in 1967.
Annette Hodgson performed this as the character Noelene in The Sapphires.
 A largely instrumental version, recorded by Stan Butcher, from his 1966 album His Birds and Brass, was used as theme tune to the weekly Saturday morning BBC Radio 1 programme Junior Choice presented by Ed Stewart.
Mirusia recorded this song on her 2019 album, A Salute to The Seekers, which charted at #1 on the Aria Jazz and Blues chart.

See also
List of train songs

References

1957 songs
1966 singles
British folk songs
British pop songs
Children's songs
Lullabies
Songs about Australia
Songs about trains
Songs written by Malvina Reynolds
The Seekers songs
Sandman
Loretta Lynn songs
The Statler Brothers songs